Deer Lodge George Jones is a tribute album to the country music singer George Jones. Released by Deer Lodge Records as DLR025 on January 21, 2014, the album features contributions from 30 artists/bands, mostly from the Northwestern United States. Twenty of the songs were recorded at Deer Lodge Studios in Portland, Oregon.

Track listing

References

George Jones tribute albums
2014 compilation albums